CloudApp is a cross-platform screen capture and screen recording desktop client that supports online storage and sharing.

CloudApp full and partial screen recordings export to .mp4 format. Full or partial screen image captures export to either JPG or PNG format. Additionally, CloudApp can create GIFs, annotate images and videos, and upload and store files.

History
CloudApp was initially launched in 2010 as a project by Max Schoening (former lead designer at Heroku). Originally, it enabled knowledge workers to instantly share screenshots and file assets as short links that didn't require a download to view. The project then moved towards visual collaboration to allow sharing screenshots, gifs, annotations, and screen recordings. The first iteration included a downloadable Mac application and accompanying free service.

CloudApp was later acquired by Aluminum.io and Xenon Ventures in January 2014, where Tyler Koblasa became General Manager and CEO. In June 2016, Koblasa secured US$2 million in a funding round led by Tikhon Bernstam, founder of Scribd and Parse, and Kyle York (CSO Dyn), which enabled him to acquire the intellectual property from Aluminum.io, invest in the platform and add founding team member Scott Smith to help scale the business.

In July 2016, CloudApp acquired the intellectual property for app Annotate, a popular Mac and iOS annotation app, from David Cancel and Elias Torres, of Boston-based Drift. In October 2019 it added collections and favorites to its platforms to allow teams and enterprises to share collections of videos, screenshots, and GIFs created with CloudApp.

In January 2020 it launched a new app to cover iPhones and iPads. In March 2020, it launched ‘Instant Video’, a new video streaming service, that uploads videos while the user captures them to make sharing instantaneous. CloudApp has been listed five quarters in a row on G2's top consumer reviewed products lists.

Features

Video
Full screen, screen only, optional audio
Full screen, window-in-window webcam, optional audio
Full screen, webcam only, optional audio
Selected region, screen only, optional audio
Selected region, window-in-window webcam, optional audio
Supports real-time video annotation
Start/pause/resume controls
End of life*

Image
GIF creation
Full screen capture
Partial screen capture
Delayed screenshot
Supports image annotation

Browser view
Share via link, email, social
Support embedded media
Permissions management
Organize in collections
Comments

Integrations
CloudApp integrates with Zendesk, Jira, Trello, Zapier, the Google Workspace, GitHub, Asana, Slack, several Freshworks products, and the Zoho Office Suite.

Platform support
CloudApp supports Linux, macOS, and Windows with a downloaded client. It also enables mobile screen recording with a native iPhone app. CloudApp has a Chrome browser extension listed in the Chrome Webstore.

See also
 Snipping Tool
 Comparison of screencasting software

References

External links
 Official website

Screenshot software
Screencasting software
Windows software
Windows multimedia software
MacOS
MacOS software